Triway High School is a public high school in Wooster, Ohio. It is the only high school in the Triway Local School District.  Their nickname is the Titans.

Background
Triway serves primarily the townships of Wooster, Franklin, and Clinton, and the village of Shreve in Wayne County, Ohio. These three areas agreed to consolidate in 1960 under the name of "Triway", and the school was opened at its current location in 1963.  In the school district there are three K-6 elementary schools: Franklin Elementary which is now shut down and has been absorbed by the Wooster Township branch of the schools, Shreve Elementary, and Wooster Township Elementary. Triway Jr. High School serves grades 7-8, and Triway High School serves grades 9-12.

Triway's colors are purple and white, which were chosen by coach Marion Zody, who also named the sports teams the "Titans" after the New York Jets previous nickname. The Titans have long-standing rivalries with the Waynedale High School Golden Bears, the West Holmes High School Knights, and the Orrville High School Red Riders.  Triway was a member of the Wayne County Athletic League from 1963-1970 (and previously as the Shreve High School Trojans) until joining the Chippewa Conference (1970-1976), then the All-Ohio Conference/League (1976-1989), and the Mohican Area Conference (1989-2004), before joining the PAC-7.

Sports
Triway has had many talented sports teams since the district was established, mostly in football and basketball. The most recent accomplishments have been:
Triway won their first OHSAA team state championship, in Girls'Bowling in 2022.
Triway won their first OHSAA Division II state championship in Girls Softball in 2022.
In the 2004-2005 season, the boys basketball team became state runners-up.
In the 2005-2006 season, the boys basketball team again became state runners-up with the season's record being a district best of 26-1.
In the 2009-2010 season of Triway football, first-year coach, Tony Lee, coached the team to one of the best seasons in Triway football history with a record of 8-3, and going into the first round of the playoffs.
In the 2013 season of Triway volleyball first year coach, John Finn, coached the team into a PAC championship, District championship and Regional Runners-up.
In the 2014-2015 season of Triway football, Tony Lee coached the team through an undefeated season and to the second round of the playoffs.
In the 2014-2015 season, the boys bowling team finished State Runner-up.
In the 2015-2016 season, the boys bowling team finished 5th at State.
In the 2017 season of Triway volleyball the team earned a PAC championship, District championship, and made it to the Sweet Sixteen. The team went undefeated in the league. This 2017 team was dominated by a superior senior group.
 In the 2021 Season of Triway Football, Coach Eric Brenner led the team to a 7-1 record which was tied for league best that resulted in a conference championship. 
In the 2021 Season, the Triway Softball Lady Titans were Division II State runners-up.
In The 2022 Season, the Triway Softball Lady Titans won their first Division II State Championship. 
Prior to the 1963 consolidation as Triway, the Shreve Trojans competed in the WCAL as a representative from the area.

Notable alumni
Josh Krajcik-Runner up on the first season of The X Factor
Ted Mathys-Author of  Null Set (2015), The Spoils (2009) and Forge (2005), all from Coffee House Press. Award Winning Poet. Instructor St. Louis University

References

External links
 District Website

Further reading
Vasas, Michale Paul, A History of Wayne County Football 1899 to 1988, Collier Printing Company of Wooster, Ohio. 1989.
History of Wayne County, Ohio, "Wayne County History Book Committee." Taylor Publishing Company, Dallas, TX. 1987.

High schools in Wayne County, Ohio
Public high schools in Ohio